Lavender is a 2019 short LGBT romantic drama film, written and directed by Matthew Puccini. It premiered at the 2019 Sundance Film Festival, where it was then acquired by Fox Searchlight Pictures for an Academy Award-qualifying theatrical run, attaching it to select screenings of The Aftermath.

The film then went on to play at the 2019 SXSW Festival, Palm Springs International ShortFest, Outfest Los Angeles, New Orleans Film Festival, NFFTY and the Provincetown International Film Festival, where it won the Here Media Award for Best Queer Short Film.

Premise
What started off as a casual hookup has quickly escalated into something far more intimate, leaving Andy to navigate Arthur and Lucas' dreamy lifestyle and marriage.

Cast
 Michael Urie as Arthur
 Michael Hsu Rosen as Andy
 Ken Barnett as Lucas
 Christopher Schaap as Boyfriend

References

External links

Lavender at Matthew Puccini's website

2019 films
2019 drama films
2019 short films
2019 LGBT-related films
2019 independent films
Gay-related films
American independent films
Fox Searchlight Pictures films
American drama short films
Kickstarter-funded films
Films directed by Matthew Puccini
2010s English-language films
2010s American films